= Campagni =

Coordinates: 41°15′13″N 14°24′24″E

Campagni is a town in Italy in the province of Province of Caserta in the Campania region.

According to a 2011 estimate, the settlement had a population of 69. The settlement is located at an altitude of 82 m above sea level.
